Bob Rosenstiel (born February 7, 1974) is a former American football tight end. He played for the Oakland Raiders in 1997 and for the New York/New Jersey Hitmen in 2001.

Rosenstiel now lives in Boerne, Texas coaching a middle school football team for Geneva School of Boerne

References

1974 births
Living people
People from Prineville, Oregon
Players of American football from Oregon
American football tight ends
Eastern Illinois Panthers football players
Oakland Raiders players
Amsterdam Admirals players
New York/New Jersey Hitmen players